The Southeast Asian Press Alliance (SEAPA) is the only regional organization focused on promoting and protecting press freedom and freedom of expression in Southeast Asia. Established as a non-profit organization in November 1998, the alliance works to unite independent journalists and press-related organizations in the region into a force for free expression advocacy and mutual protection.

SEAPA's board of trustees is composed of representatives from the alliance's Founding Members, including:

 Thai Journalists Association
 Institute for Studies on Free Flow of Information (Indonesia)
 Alliance of Independent Journalists (Indonesia)
 Center for Media Freedom and Responsibility (Philippines)
 Philippine Center for Investigative Journalism

SEAPA is registered in Manila as a regional non-governmental organization. It has offices in Manila and houses its main secretariat in Bangkok.

SEAPA is an associate member of the International Freedom of Expression Exchange (IFEX), a global network of non-governmental organisations that work to promote and defend the right to free expression.

Members 
The following are SEAPA's member organizations:

Cambodia 

  Cambodian Center for Human Rights (CCHR)
 Cambodian Center for Independent Media (CCIM)

Indonesia 

 Aliansi Jurnalis Independen (Alliance of Independent Journalists, AJI-Indonesia)
 Institut Studi Arus Informasi (Institute for Studies on the Free Flow of Information, ISAI, Indonesia)
 Forum Jurnalis Perempuan – Indonesia (Forum of Women Journalists in Indonesia, FJP Indonesia) – associate member

Malaysia 

 Centre for Independent Journalism (CIJ, Malaysia)

Myanmar 

 Burma News InternationalBNI-wide (BNI) – associate member
 Myanmar Journalist Network (MJN) – associate member

Philippines 

 Center for Media Freedom and Responsibility (CMFR, Philippines)
 Philippine Center for Investigative Journalism (PCIJ)
 National Union of Journalists in the Philippines – associate member

Thailand 

 Thai Journalists Association (TJA)

Timor Leste (Timor Lorosae) 

 Asosiasaun Jornalista Timor Lorosa’e (Timor Leste Journalist Association, AJTL)

See also 

 International Freedom of Expression Exchange

External links
 SEAPA blog

References 

Philippine journalism organizations
Freedom of expression organizations
Organizations established in 1988
Southeast Asia
Organizations based in Manila